Julie Monroe is an American film editor best known (along with fellow film editors Joe Hutshing, Pietro Scalia and David Brenner) for having been one of director Oliver Stone's 'hot shot' group of up-and-coming film editors.

Julie Monroe's credits include JFK (as Associate Editor), De-Lovely, Gigli, Hanging Up, Life as a House, and The Patriot.

Filmography

As film editor
The director of each film is indicated in parenthesis.
 JFK (Stone-1991) (associate editor)
 Indecent Proposal (Lyne-1993) (additional film editor)
 Lolita (Lyne-1997)
 At First Sight (Winkler-1999)
 The Patriot (Emmerich-2000)
 Hanging Up (Keaton-2000)
 Life as a House (Winkler-2001)
 Gigli (Brest-2003)
 De-Lovely (Winkler-2004)
 The Big White (Mylod-2005)
 World Trade Center (Stone-2006)
 W. (Stone-2008)
 What's Your Number? (Mylod-2011)
 Mud (Nichols-2012)
 Danny Collins (Fogelman-2015)
 Midnight Special (Nichols-2016)
 Loving (Nichols-2016)
 Burden (Heckler-2018)
 Life Itself (Fogelman-2018)
 Wine Country (Poehler-2019)
 The Pizza Tip (Karenny-2021)
 Moxie (Poehler-2021)

As assistant film editor
 Salvador (1986) (assistant editor)
 Platoon (1986) (assistant editor)
 Wall Street (1987) (assistant editor)
 A Time of Destiny (1988) (second assistant editor)
 How I Got into College (1989) (assistant editor)
 Born on the Fourth of July (1989) (first assistant film editor)
 The Doors (1991) (first assistant editor)
 The River Wild (1994) (first assistant editor)

Awards and nominations
2005 – De-Lovely - nominated for American Cinema Editors (ACE) Eddie (Best Edited Feature Film)

External links

American film editors
Living people
Year of birth missing (living people)
Place of birth missing (living people)